This is a list of films which have placed number one at the weekend box office in Canada during 2007.

Weekend gross list

Highest-grossing films in Canada

References

External links

See also
List of Canadian films

2007
Canada
2007 in Canadian cinema